Dhont is a Belgian surname. Notable people with the surname include:

 Elena Dhont (born 1998), Belgian footballer
 Erik Dhont (born 1962), Belgian landscape architect
 Galuëlle Dhont, French gymnast
 Lukas Dhont, Belgian film director and screenwriter

Surnames of Belgian origin